'Koullis Evangelou Greek (Κυριάκος Ευαγγελου) (born 28 October 1972) is a Football player who played Center back In the Cypriot division 1. He played  for Aris Limassol F.C.1983-1996 and he was the Captain (sports) then he got transferred to Omonoia Nicosia he was there for two seasons then he decided to leave and went to Alki Larnaca F.C. after Alki he continued to play in lower league teams. After that he retired and is now playing some matches with Omonoias Veterans and Aris Veterans.

References

Aris Limassol FC players
Association football defenders
1972 births
Living people
Cypriot footballers
AC Omonia players